Sergey Volkov (born December 6, 1987 in Chusovoy, Russian SSR, Soviet Union) is a Russian freestyle skier, specializing in  moguls.

Volkov competed at the 2010 Winter Olympics for Russia. He did not advance to the moguls final, placing 28th in the qualifying round.

As of March 2013, his best showing at the World Championships is 6th in the 2011 dual moguls event.

Volkov made his World Cup debut in December 2009. His first career podium, a bronze in dual moguls at Mont Gabriel in 2011/12, was followed a month later by his first win, in the same even at Deer Valley. As of March 2013, those are his best World Cup performances. His best World Cup overall finish is 6th, in 2011/12.

World Cup Podiums

References

1987 births
Living people
Olympic freestyle skiers of Russia
Freestyle skiers at the 2010 Winter Olympics
Freestyle skiers at the 2014 Winter Olympics
People from Chusovoy
Russian male freestyle skiers
Sportspeople from Perm Krai